Ano Liosia is a suburb and a former municipality in the northern part of the Athens agglomeration, Greece. Since the 2011 local government reform it is part of the municipality Fyli, of which it is the seat and a municipal unit. The municipal unit has an area of 38.447 km2.

Geography
Ano Liosia lies in the eastern part of West Attica, between the mountains Parnitha to its north and Aigaleo to its southwest. It is 3 km west of Acharnes, 3 km north of Kamatero, 4 km southeast of Fyli, 10 km east of Aspropyrgos and 11 km north of Athens city centre.

Transportation

The Ano Liosia railway station is served by Proastiakos trains to the Athens International Airport and to Kiato in the Peloponnese. The railway station on the old metric Piraeus–Patras railway is now closed.  Ano Liosia is connected to the rest of Athens by various bus lines, most notably the B12 and E42 lines. Motorway 6 runs south of the town.

History
On September 7, 1999, the 1999 Athens earthquake damaged between one hundred and a thousand homes. The 2007 Greek forest fires devastated the nearby forests.

Population

A significant population of Romani live in the area.

Crime

Ano Liosia is considered one of the most dangerous ghettos of Greece and along with its neighbouring cities Acharnes and Zefyri hold the highest crime rates of the whole country. Many drug addicts from various districts of Attica arrive to Ano Liosia as it is a convenient region to find their dose owing to the many dealers and the low to absent police patrols.

Sports

The 11th International Chess Tournament took place in Ano Liosia in 2001. The following sports teams are based in Ano Liosia:
Akratitos - a Greek football/soccer team which was founded in 1963
Das Ano Liosia - a Greek basketball team

Sports venues:
Ano Liosia Olympic Hall where wrestling and judo were played in the 2004 Summer Olympics
Zofria Indoor Hall - basketball arena that has been used by AEK Athens.
Stadium for Akratitos rarely plays in this stadium
Basketball stadium for Das Ano Liosia
Football/soccer stadium for Akratitos

References

External links
City of Ano Liosia official website 
http://www.chess.gr/anoliosia/
http://www.stadia.gr/anoliossia/anoliossia.html

Populated places in West Attica
Fyli